Rosa Bouton (c. December 19, 1860 – February 15, 1951) was an American chemist and professor who organized and directed the School of Domestic Science (now the Department of Nutrition and Health Sciences) at the University of Nebraska–Lincoln in 1898. Despite the lack of funding, Rosa Bouton worked to provide a course to teach young women about the realms of domestic science. As years passed and the demand for more courses and areas of study emerged, Bouton, as the sole instructor, continued to strengthen and build the department to provide such an education to these women.

Early life 
Rosa Bouton was born on December 19, 1860, in Albany, Kansas, near present-day Sabetha. Rosa was one of five children. Her mother was Fanny (Waldo) Bouton and her father was Eli F. Bouton. Prior to her birth, Rosa's parents had just settled in the northeast town of Kansas after traveling cross country from New York State. At the age of seven, Rosa faced the death of her mother. Her father, Eli Bouton, was an accredited school teacher and worked in education for many years. After the death of his wife in 1867, Eli soon remarried.

Education 
Rosa began her studies at the State Normal School in Peru, Nebraska. After just two years, in 1881, Rosa received her teaching certificate. Her work was recognized by a professor at the State Normal School, Henry Hudson Nicholson. Following his work at the State School, Nicholson moved on to teach chemistry at the University of Nebraska – Lincoln. As a consequence of Rosa's fine work, Nicholson invited Rosa to go to Nebraska with him. In 1888 Rosa enrolled in graduate school at the University of Nebraska – Lincoln and studied chemistry. Throughout her schooling years, Rosa also served as an instructor in the chemistry department. In 1891, she graduated with a Bachelor of Science degree and, just two years later, she also received a Master of Liberal Arts Degree.

Career

1893–1912: Early career 
Following her graduation, Rosa Bouton remained very active within the scientific community. She continued to work for the chemistry department at the University of Nebraska – Lincoln (UNL), joined the American Chemical Society in 1893 and performed research that she would later publish in 1898. Rosa was the second female member of the American Chemical Society. While a graduate student at UNL, Rosa also was employed by the chemistry department, for whom she taught classes. For several years, Rosa taught courses relating both to analytical chemistry and applied domestic chemistry. The domestic science courses covered subjects such as food analysis, sanitation, and contaminants in food. Additionally, Rosa conducted research with a fellow faculty member, Samuel Avery, at UNL and in 1898 was published in the Journal of the American Chemical Society on her work with phenylglutaric acids. Her focus of study was on acids alongside the effect that phenyl groups have on the properties of acids.

In 1898, the University of Nebraska established a new School of Domestic Science. Along with this came the school's request for Rosa to organize it. Rosa had spent a lot of her time expanding upon her education and in 1894, she met with Ellen Swallow. Swallow was an active leader in organizing college-level courses related to home economic, of whom Rosa learned a lot from. It was in the school's best interest to have Rosa instruct these courses due to her dedication and expertise in this area of study. Rosa accepted this offer and began her work in developing this program. She was given an initial fifteen dollars from the school to acquire appliances including tables, sinks, stoves, cupboards, and other supplies vital to teaching domestic science. While this was not enough to equip the classroom with the proper materials, Rosa also received funding from the chemistry department with the help of her colleague, Henry Nicholson. Beyond this, Rosa often spent her own money on supplies and training. The summer of 1898, after accepting her role in this department, Rosa paid for herself to travel to Boston. There, she learned more about this the field of domestic science in order to improve the effect she would have on the department and women that she would be instructing the next fall. When the school officially opened, there were eleven students enrolled. Within two years, the enrollment had increased to forty-one and at this point, Rosa was named the director of this school. In 1906, just eight years after it first opened, the School of Domestic Science grew from a two-year program to a four-year program and was later renamed the College of Home Economics. With this came training for new instructors as well. The school continued to expand as the years passed; Rosa designed a new school that would be built in 1908. She spent a lot of time researching the quality and design of already established scientific facilities when planning for this construction. Another milestone came in 1912 when the enrollment for the School of Domestic Science reached over three hundred students. By this point, the school had also hired more trained instructors who would take over for Rosa Bouton in 1912 when she was asked to step down from her position. Rosa played a very large role in the local and national Home Economics Association and had written articles that were published in both The Nebraska Teacher and The Nebraska Farmer. Her reputation was well established in Nebraska, however, at the age of fifty-one, she resigned from UNL and moved out of Nebraska.

1916–1951: Later career 
From 1912 to 1916, Rosa lived in San Diego, California where she ran a small speciality bakery. After the bakery's failure, she reentered the education industry and began teaching home economics courses at a high school in a small town in Arizona, called Winkelman, for about a year. Rosa was a woman of many trades as she accepted a position to become a home demonstration agent for the Arizona Agricultural Extension Services where she served in communities, helping women and working as a nurse and counselor. At the age of seventy-four, Rosa retired and moved back to California to live with her sister, Mary Bouton. As the years passed, she continued to watch as the UNL Department of Domestic Science continued to expand and grow. Years later, after fighting a long illness, Rosa Bouton died in Pomona, California, on February 15, 1951.

Legacy 
Rosa's legacy continues as she is considered a founding member of the Nebraska local section. Additionally, a women's dormitory at UNL was named in honor of her dedication to the school and contribution to its success.

References 

1860 births
1951 deaths
American women chemists
People from Brown County, Kansas
University of Nebraska–Lincoln faculty
University of Nebraska–Lincoln alumni
American women academics